Amelia Wilson was built in France under another name and captured by the British in 1809. Her new owners renamed her and she became a West Indiaman. She later became a whaler and was wrecked in 1833 on her fifth whaling voyage.

Career
The prize court condemned the French vessel on 21 April 1809. She then first appears in Lloyd's Register in 1810. Her owner was Wilson & Co., suggesting that her name represents a relative of the owner. She underwent repairs in that year. She then traded with the West Indies. She underwent a good repair in 1813 from which she emerged with an increased burthen.

Whaling voyage #1 (1818–1819): Captain Andrew Stirton sailed from Britain on 13 January 1818, bound for Timor. He returned on 13 August 1819 with 650 casks of whale oil.

Whaling voyage #2 (1819–1821): Captain Michael Underwood sailed from Britain on 27 September 1819, bound for Timor. In January 1821 she was at Ambon, in company with Greenwich. Underwood returned to Britain on 30 November 1821 with 650 casks.

Whaling voyage #3 (1822–1824): Amelia Wilson underwent a thorough repair in 1822. Captain Underwood then sailed  from Britain on 11 March 1822, again bound for Timor. She left St Helena on 20 July 1824 and arrived in Britain on 1 October 1824 with 800 casks.

Whaling voyage #4 (1824–1827): Captain Underwood sailed from Britain on 30 November 1824, bound for Timor and the seas off Japan. On 12 January 1825 Amelia Wilson was at Teneriffe, and by 2 May she was at Timor. In November she was off Guam. On 14 January 1827 she was in the Timor Sea again. At some point she landed 300 tuns of sperm oil at St Helena. On 21 September she returned to England with 650 casks.

Amelia Wilson was almost rebuilt in 1829. She then made a voyage to India as a merchantman. One edition of the Register of Shipping has her sailing to India under a license from the British East India Company. A different edition of the Register of Shipping (1830) has her leaving England on 21 March 1829.

Whaling voyage #5 (1831–loss in 1833): Captain Wilson sailed Amelia Wilson from Britain on 23 November 1831, bound for the Pacific Ocean.

Fate
Amelia Wilson was wrecked on rocks about 40 miles north of Port Lloyd in the Bonin Islands in May or June 1833. The crew were saved, but some 1440 barrels of oil were lost. Three boats, with 12 men, arrived at Port Lloyd.

Citations

References
Foreign Office, Great Britain (1853) British and Foreign State Papers, Volume 25, Part 1. (H.M. Stationery Office).
 

Ships built in France
Captured ships
Merchant ships of the United Kingdom
Age of Sail merchant ships
Whaling ships
Maritime incidents in 1833
1800s ships